El Bañado may refer to:

 El Bañado (Valle Viejo), a municipality in Catamarca Province in Argentina
 El Bañado (La Paz), a village and municipality in Catamarca Province in Argentina
 El Bañado (Capayán), a village and municipality in Catamarca Province in Argentina